Port-au-Prince Cosmorama was an exhibition of perspective pictures of different places and landmarks in the world, held on March 2, 1834 in Port-au-Prince, Haiti.

Cosmoramic Views Exhibited
 View of Paris, with Place Vendôme and the beautiful high column by Napoéon.
 View the Père Lachaise cemetery in Paris, presenting the graves of Molière, Lafontaine Delisle, Grétri etc.
 View of the beautiful and pistoresque fall of Te-quendama in Colombia, near Santa Fe de Bogota.
 Perspective view of Madrid and the palace King of Spain.
 Interior view of London with a view of the Thames from Black Friars Bridge, the prospect of the beautiful church of St. Paul.
 View of the Battle of New Orleans, between the Americans and the English. (January 8, 1815)

External links
 Port-au-Prince Cosmorama 

Galleries in Haiti
 Galerie Marassa - Pétion-Ville
 Galerie Monnin - Pétion-Ville
 Galerie d'Art Nader - Pétion-Ville

Galleries in the United States
HaitianArt.com Boca Raton, Florida
 MedaliaArt - New York
 Indigo Arts Gallery - Pennsylvania
 Galerie Lakaye - California
 Galerie Macondo - Pennsylvania
 Studio Wah - Maryland
 Nader Haitian Art Gallery- New York

Films
 Films on Haitian artists and Haitian art by Arnold Antonin - USA

Websites
 Noted Haitian collector/writer
 HaitianArt.com 
 Haiti Metal Art
 Haiti Gallery
 Tropic Decor
 NaderHaitianArt.com 

 
Panoramas